Buck Mountain is a summit in Iron County in the U.S. state of Missouri.

Buck Mountain most likely was named after the bucks in the area.

References

Mountains of Iron County, Missouri
Mountains of Missouri